Brooklyn Celtic was a name used by at least two U.S. soccer teams. The first was an early twentieth century amateur team which was formed in August 1910 and dominated the New York Amateur Association Football League from 1912 to 1917.  The second was a member of the professional American Football League in the 1930s and early 1940s.  A third Celtic club from Brooklyn, St. Mary's Celtic replaced the second club in the ASL before the 1935/36 season.

Brooklyn Celtic I 

The Brooklyn Celtic, also known as the Brooklyn Celtics and Celtic F.C., was an early twentieth century American soccer team which competed in the New York Amateur Association Football League. They won the second division in 1910–1911, gaining promotion to the first division.  They proved their worth as a first division team in the 1911–1912 season when they tied New York Clan MacDonald for second place.  The two teams met in a playoff for sole position of second, with Clan MacDonald winning 1–0. The next season, Celtic went on a streak of five straight league championships.

Year-by-year

Honors

 National Challenge Cup
 Runner-up (2): 1914, 1915
 American Cup
 Runner-up (1): 1915
 American Amateur Football Association Cup
 Winner (1): 1912
League Championship – Division I
 Winner (5): 1913, 1914, 1915, 1916, 1917
 League Championship – Division II
 Winner (1): 1910
 Sultana Cup
 Winner (1): 1917
Southern New York State Cup
 Winner (2): 1914, 1917

Notable players
 James Robertson
Roddy O'Halloran
 George Tintle

Brooklyn Celtic II 

The Brooklyn Celtic was an American soccer club based in Brooklyn, New York that was an inaugural member of the reformed American Soccer League. The club was newly organized in the fall of 1933 and joined the ASL soon after.

The club was dropped from the league after the 1934/35 season and replaced by St. Mary's Soccer Club.

Year-by-year

St. Mary's Celtic 

St. Mary's Celtic was an American soccer club based in Brooklyn, New York that was a member of the reformed American Soccer League. The club replaced Brooklyn Celtic before the 1935–36 season.

St. Mary's won their first (and only) National Cup in 1939 after beating Manhattan Beer 5–1 on aggregate over two legs. The second leg was held in Starlight Park with an attendance of 8,000.

Year-by-year

References

Men's soccer clubs in New York (state)
Defunct soccer clubs in New York City
American Soccer League (1933–1983) teams
Sports in Brooklyn
U.S. Open Cup winners